Marthalen Landi-Silo is a 35 metres high silo east of Marthalen in Switzerland. Marthalen Landi-Silo is one of the few buildings with a wind turbine on the roof.

Buildings and structures in the canton of Zürich